The following highways are numbered 18A:

Canada

 Prince Edward Island Route 18A

United States
 County Road 18A (Union County, Florida)
 Nebraska Spur 18A
 Nevada State Route 18A (former)
 New York State Route 18A (former)
 County Route 18A (Otsego County, New York)
 County Route 18A (Washington County, New York)
 Oklahoma State Highway 18A